The Flowers of Romance was an early punk band, formed in mid-1976 by Jo Faull and Sarah Hall, girlfriends at the time of Steve Jones and Paul Cook of the Sex Pistols. The band did not release any recordings and, like London SS and Masters of the Backside, are more famed for the number of band members that later became well known, including: Sid Vicious of the Sex Pistols, Keith Levene (an early member of The Clash and later of Public Image Ltd), and Palmolive and Viv Albertine of The Slits. Despite never playing live, they were interviewed by SKUM fanzine in which Sid Vicious proclaimed "I'll just be the yob that I am now".

The highly controversial song "Belsen Was a Gas", about the Nazi concentration camp Bergen-Belsen, was written for this band by Vicious and Levene. It was performed live by the Sex Pistols, Public Image Ltd, and Sid Vicious' solo act. Viv Albertine wrote "So Tough" for the band, with the song eventually appearing on The Slits' debut album Cut.

The band's name was suggested by Johnny Rotten, and subsequently became the title of an early Sex Pistols song, as well as a 1981 Public Image Ltd album and its title track.

Personnel
Sid Vicious – Vocals, guitar, saxophone
Keith Levene – Guitar
Viv Albertine – Guitar
Jo Faull – Guitar
Marco Pirroni – Guitar (very briefly)
Steve Walsh - Guitar

Sarah "Rouge" Hall – Bass
Steve Spittle - Bass

Palmolive – Drums
Kenny Morris - Drums

References

External links
 
 

Musical groups from London
Sex Pistols
English punk rock groups
Musical groups established in 1976
Musical groups disestablished in 1977
1976 establishments in England
1977 disestablishments in England